1972 in Korea may refer to:
1972 in North Korea
1972 in South Korea